Hamm is a city in North Rhine-Westphalia, Germany.

Hamm can also refer to:

Places
Germany
Hamm (Sieg), a municipality in the Verbandsgemeinde Hamm (Sieg) in the district of Altenkirchen, Rhineland-Palatinate
Hamm, Bitburg-Prüm, part of the Verbandsgemeinde Bitburg-Land, Rhineland-Palatinate
Hamm am Rhein, part of the Verbandsgemeinde Eich, Rhineland-Palatinate
Düsseldorf-Hamm, a borough of Düsseldorf
Hamm, Hamburg, a neighborhood of Hamburg

Luxembourg
Hamm, Luxembourg, a suburb of Luxembourg

People
Hamm (surname)

Fictional characters
Hamm (character), a character in Samuel Beckett's play Endgame.
Hamm the toy, the piggy bank from the movie Toy Story and the Pixar film, Cars, as a piggy bank minivan.

Other uses
Hamm AG, a manufacturer of road rollers.

See also 
Ham (disambiguation)